Hans Natonek  (28 October 1892 – 23 October 1963), pen name N. O. Kent, was a Jewish-Czech-German-American author and journalist.

He was born in Königliche Weinberge, Prague and died in Tucson, Arizona.

References

1892 births
1963 deaths
Czech male writers
German male writers
Jewish American writers
20th-century Czech writers
20th-century American male writers
20th-century American Jews
Czechoslovak emigrants to the United States